Third Party (stylised Third ≡ Party) is a British progressive house DJ duo consisting of Jonnie Macaire and Harry Bass, based in Essex, London. They are best known for their single "Everyday Of My Life" and the collaboration "Lions in the Wild" with Dutch DJ Martin Garrix. They began their musical career as producers by releasing singles and remixes.

Career 
The duo met at school and via their mutual interest in music production, they formed Third Party. They pursued further musical education at a music technical college for a year, funding themselves with part-time jobs. They later performed as DJs at local clubs in London while continuing studio production.

In 2012, Third Party released three singles – "Lights" with Steve Angello, "Feel" with Cicada and "Thank You". In 2014, they released "Everyday of My Life" as a single. They founded Release Records, their own record label in 2015, in partnership with Armada Music. Third Party's single "Alive" served as the label's first release. On 27 May 2016, they released "Lions in the Wild" with Martin Garrix. Their debut studio album "Hope", featuring eleven songs was released on 24 February 2017. They began working on the album from late 2015. They are resident DJs at Ministry of Sound club.

Discography

Albums

Singles

Remixes 

2011
 Emeli Sande featuring Naughty Boy – "Daddy" (Third Party Remix)
 Tiesto – What Can We Do (A Deeper Love) (Third Party Remix)

2012
 Sultan + Ned Shepard and Thomas Sagstad featuring Dirty Vegas – "Somebody to Love" (Third Party Remix)
 Wynter Gordon – "Still Getting Younger" (Third Party Remix)
Swedish House Mafia - "Save The World" (Third Party Remix)

2013
 Red Hot Chili Peppers – "Otherside" (Third Party Remix)

2014
 Sigma – "Nobody to Love" (Third Party Remix)

2015
 Kygo featuring Conrad Sewell – "Firestone" (Third Party Private Remix)

2016
 Corey James and Will K – "Another Storm" (Third Party Unlocked Mix)

2017
 Third Party – "Everyday of My Life" (VIP Mix)

2020
 Armin van Buuren featuring Cimo Fränkel – "All Comes Down" (Third Party Remix)

Notes

References

DJs from London
English house music duos
Musical groups from London
Progressive house musicians
Stmpd Rcrds artists
Electronic dance music DJs
DJ duos